Lebyazhye is a rural locality (a selo) and the administrative center of Lebyazhenskoye Rural Settlement, Kamyshinsky District, Volgograd Oblast, Russia. The population was 1,695 as of 2010. There are 9 streets.

Geography 
Lebyazhye is located in steppe, on the Volga Upland, on the left bank of the Ilovlya River, 30 km northwest of Kamyshin (the district's administrative centre) by road. Petrov Val is the nearest rural locality.

References 

Rural localities in Kamyshinsky District